The Eiffel Building (Portuguese: Edifício Eiffel) is a mixed-use building in the República district of São Paulo, Brazil. It was designed by the architect Oscar Niemeyer (1907–2012) and sits on the southwestern of Praça da República, the Square of the Republic. The building was designed in 1953 and completed in 1956. The Eiffel Building is a Brazilian example of the Cartesian skyscraper, a building type developed by Le Corbusier.

References

Modernist architecture in Brazil
Oscar Niemeyer buildings
Residential buildings completed in 1956
Residential skyscrapers in Brazil